Ward Franz (born June 3, 1963) is an American politician who served in the Missouri House of Representatives from the 151st district from 2005 to 2013.

References

1963 births
Living people
Republican Party members of the Missouri House of Representatives